The AIAW women's basketball tournament was a national tournament for women's collegiate basketball teams in the United States, held annually from 1972 to 1982.  The winners of the AIAW tournaments from 1972 to 1981 are recognized as the national champions for those years.

History
The AIAW tournament was discontinued after the NCAA began sponsoring a women's collegiate basketball tournament in 1982.  (In 1982, both the AIAW and NCAA sponsored competing tournaments.)  The AIAW tournament was preceded by a tournament sponsored by the Commission on Intercollegiate Athletics for Women (CIAW), which was held from 1969 to 1971.

Sixteen teams were invited to the tournament following qualifying rounds played on college campuses (except 24 teams were invited for the 1980 and 1981 tournaments). Ten of the sixteen teams were the winners of regional tournaments. The country had nine regions, but the Eastern regional was subdivided in a Region 1A and a Region 1B. The winners of those regional championships automatically proceeded to the National tournament, then a selection committee chose additional teams based upon considerations for individual team performance and geographical balance.  Beginning in 1975, the AIAW divided its teams into divisions, and held separate tournaments for Division II and Division III teams.

Pre-NCAA statistics, based on AIAW Archives, Special Collections, University of Maryland Libraries.

Division I/Large College

CIAW
1969 West Chester (Pennsylvania) def. Western Carolina 65-39 (CIAW invitational tournament, six player format)
1970 Cal State-Fullerton def. West Chester 50-46 (CIAW invitational tournament, six player format)
1971 Mississippi State College for Women def. West Chester 57-55 (CIAW qualification tournament)

AIAW

Team appearances
The code in each cell represents the furthest the team made it in the respective tournament:
  National Champion
  National Runner-up
 ,  Round of 12 or 16 (9th-16th place)
  Play-in Round (Starting 2013) Round of 24 (17th-24th place)

Division II/Small College

Results

Appearances

Division III

Results

Appearances

Junior/Community College 

1973 Mississippi Gulf Coast Junior College
1974 Anderson College (South Carolina)
1975 Anderson College
1976 Anderson College
1977 Anderson College

See also 
 National Women's Invitational Tournament
 NAIA Women's Basketball Championships – began 1981
 NCAA Division I women's basketball tournament – began 1982
 NCAA Division II women's basketball tournament – began 1982
 NCAA Division III women's basketball tournament – began 1982
 Association for Intercollegiate Athletics for Women
 Major women's sport leagues in North America

References

Sources
 

1982 disestablishments in the United States
College women's basketball competitions in the United States
Postseason college basketball competitions in the United States
Recurring sporting events established in 1972
1972 establishments in the United States
Recurring sporting events disestablished in 1982